Kenneth Dodge is the William McDougall Distinguished Professor of Public Policy and Professor of Psychology and Neuroscience at Duke University. He is also the founding and past director of the Duke University Center for Child and Family Policy and founder of Family Connects International.

Background

Dodge was born on July 20, 1954, and grew up in Chicago, Illinois. He completed his undergraduate degree in psychology at Northwestern University in 1975 and his Ph.D. in psychology at Duke University in 1978.

Career

Dodge, a clinical and developmental psychologist, is a widely cited expert on the development, prevention and policy of aggressive behavior and chronic violence in children. He is recognized for transforming school-based interventions to improve children's social competence and early childhood interventions to prevent child abuse and promote early child development. Through his research, Dodge concluded that early physical abuse can result in biased patterns of social information processing in children, and in subsequent aggressive behavior and school failure. Based on these findings, Dodge and his colleagues established the Fast Track Project, a comprehensive program designed to prevent young adult chronic violence by working with high-risk children to develop their academic and social skills. He was also instrumental in creating Family Connects, a community-wide program to prevent child abuse and promote young children's school readiness by providing free in-home nurse visits to all infants and their families. Piloted in Durham County, North Carolina., the program has been evaluated in two randomized controlled trials and a field experiment. Results include: decreased infant emergency medical care in a child's first year of life, decreased mother's anxiety, and decreased child maltreatment investigations.

Dodge has published more than 500 scientific articles, and is among the most highly cited developmental psychologists in the world. In 2003, he was recognized by the Web of Science as being among the top 0.5 percent of “Most Highly-Cited Scientists”. Dodge was elected to the National Academy of Medicine in 2015. Dodge serves on the editorial board for the journals Clinical Psychological Science, Parenting: Science and Practice, and Aggressive Behavior.
Prior to arriving at Duke, Dodge served on the faculties of Indiana University, the University of Colorado and Vanderbilt University.

Selected service committees

 President, Society for Research in Child Development (2019–2021)
President-elect, Society for Research in Child Development (2017–2019)
 Member, Panel on the Working Class, Brookings Institution and America Enterprise Institute (2017–)
 Member, advisory board, Weiss Institute (2017–2019)
 Member, advisory board, Frank Porter Graham Child Development Institute, University of North Carolina (2017–)
 Member, council of directors, International Society for Research on Aggression (2016–)
 Member, American Psychological Association Task Force on Violent Media (2013– )
 Member, board of directors, North Carolina Early Childhood Foundation (2013– )
 Elected Member, Board of directors of the Society for Prevention Research (2012– )
 Elected member, Governing Council for the Society for Research in Child Development (2011–2017)
 Co-author, Brief of Amici Curiae to the United States Supreme Court on Behalf of Petitioners, Evan Miller v. State of Alabama, Kuntrell Jackson v. State of Arkansas (January 2012)
 Member, scientific advisory board, America's Promise (2004–2016)

Awards

Selected works
 Muschkin, C.G., Ladd, H.F., Dodge, K.A., & Bai, Y. (2020). Gender Differences in the Impact of North Carolina's Early Care and Education Initiatives on Student Outcomes in Elementary School. Educational Policy, 34(2), 377–407. doi: 10.1177/0895904818773901. 
Dodge, K.A., Goodman, W.B. Bai, Y. O’Donnell, K. & Murphy, R.A. (2019). Effect of a Community Agency-Administered Nurse Home Visitation Program on Program Use and Maternal and Infant Health Outcomes: A Randomized Clinical Trial. Jama Network Open 2(11), e1914522..  doi: 10.1001/jamanetworkopen.2019.14522.
Dodge, K.A. (2019). Redefining the science and policy of early childhood intervention programs. Pediatrics, 144(6), e20192606. doi:10.1542/peds.2019-2606.
Daro, D., Dodge, K.A., & Haskins, R. (Eds.) (2019). Universal approaches to promoting healthy development. [Special issue]. Future of Children, 29(1).
Goodman, W.B., Dodge, K.A., Bai, Y., O’Donnell, K. & Murphy, R.A. (2019). Randomized controlled trial of Family Connects: Effects on child emergency medical care from birth – 24 months. Development and Psychopathology, 31(5), 1863–72. doi: 10.1017/S0954579419000889.
Goodman, W.B., Dodge, K.A., Bai, Y., O’Donnell, K. & Murphy, R.A. (2019). Randomized controlled trial of Family Connects: Effects on child emergency medical care from birth – 24 months. Development and Psychopathology, 31(5), 1863–72. doi: 10.1017/S0954579419000889.

 Dodge, K.A. (2018). Toward population impact from early childhood psychological interventions. American Psychologist, 73(9), 1117–1129. doi: 10.1037/amp0000393.  PMCID: PMC6416783.

 Dodge, K.A. (Editor) (2017). The current state of scientific knowledge on pre-kindergarten effects. Washington, DC: The Brookings Institution.
 Bierman, K.L., Greenberg M.T., Coie, J.D., Dodge, K.A., Lochman, J.E., & McMahon, R.J. (2017). Social and emotional skills training for children: The Fast Track friendship group manual. New York: Guilford Press.
 
 
 
 
 
 
 
 Dodge, K.A., Malone, P.S., Lansford, J.E., Miller, S., Pettit, G.S., & Bates, J.E. "A Dynamic Cascade Model of the Development of Substance-Use Onset". Monographs of the Society for Research in Child Development. 74, Serial No. 294, 2009.

References

Living people
1954 births
21st-century American psychologists
Domestic violence academics
Duke University faculty
Duke University alumni
Northwestern University alumni
20th-century American psychologists